Pasquale Tegano (born January 14, 1955, in Reggio Calabria) is an Italian criminal and a member of the 'Ndrangheta, the Calabrian mafia. He was a wanted figure from 1994 and included in the list of most wanted fugitives in Italy, until his arrest on August 6, 2004.

With his brother Giovanni Tegano, he is considered to be the boss of the Tegano 'ndrina. The clan hails from the Archi neighbourhood in the city of Reggio Calabria. He has been sentenced to life imprisonment for murder, extortion and mafia association.

Second 'Ndrangheta war

The Tegano clan sided with the De Stefano clan in the Second 'Ndrangheta war, which raged from 1985 to 1991. The alliance was sealed by the marriage between Orazio De Stefano and Antonietta Benestare, a niece of Giovanni Tegano on December 2, 1985. The bloody six-year war between the Condello-Imerti clan and De Stefano allied with the Tegano clan left 621 deaths.

While the main leaders of De Stefano clan were killed it fell upon the Teganos to wage the war. The Teganos were the key negotiators for the 'pax mafiosa' in Reggio Calabria in the 1990s between the Tegano, De Stefano, Libri and Latella clans on one side and the Imerti, Serraino, Condello and Rosmini clans on the other, in which they divided their spheres of influence in Reggio Calabria.

Fugitive and arrest
He became a fugitive in 1994, and was arrested on August 6, 2004. At that time, differences between the Tegano clan and the De Stefanos emerged over the division of extortion rackets. The Teganos secured the neutrality of their old enemy Pasquale Condello.

References

Books
 Gratteri, Nicola & Antonio Nicaso (2006). Fratelli di Sangue, Cosenza: Luigi Pellegrini Editore 
Paoli, Letizia (2003). Mafia Brotherhoods: Organized Crime, Italian Style, New York: Oxford University Press  (Review by Klaus Von Lampe) (Review by Alexandra V. Orlova)

1955 births
Fugitives
Fugitives wanted by Italy
Italian prisoners sentenced to life imprisonment
Living people
'Ndranghetisti
'Ndranghetisti sentenced to life imprisonment
People from Reggio Calabria